Alfred Augustin Watson (August 21, 1818 – April 21, 1905) was first bishop of the Diocese of East Carolina in the Episcopal Church in the United States of America.

Biography
Following education at New York University, he was ordained to the diaconate by Benjamin T. Onderdonk on November 3, 1844; and to the priesthood by Levi Silliman Ives on May 25, 1845. During the Civil War, he was chaplain to the Second Regiment of North Carolina State troops. At the time of his death, he was the oldest living bishop in the Episcopal Church, and the senior member of General Convention in order of service, having been first elected to the House of Deputies for North Carolina in 1850.

He was consecrated on April 17, 1884.

Bishop Watson married three times, and was survived by his third wife, Mary C. Watson (née Lord).

References

Obituary in The Living Church, April 29, 1905, p. 890.

1818 births
1905 deaths
19th-century American Episcopalians
Burials at Oakdale Cemetery
People from Brooklyn
New York University alumni
Episcopal bishops of East Carolina
19th-century American clergy